Michael James Quirke (born 10 September 1991) is a footballer who plays as a defender for Coventry United. A Coventry City youth product, he used to be a goalkeeper. Born in England, he made one appearance for the Republic of Ireland U21 national team in 2011.

Club career
Quirke, made his professional debut with Coventry City as a substitute on 14 August 2010 in a 2–2 Championship draw with Watford, coming on to replace injured Iain Turner after 18 minutes. In March 2010 he joined Nuneaton Town on work experience terms, and made his sole appearance for the club in a Birmingham Senior Cup tie against Leamington. He rejoined Nuneaton on loan in January 2011, making his debut in the Conference North fixture versus Redditch United. On 8 March 2011, he made his first team start for the Sky Blues in a 1–1 draw with Doncaster Rovers.

On 5 May 2011, Quirke was informed that he would not be having his contract renewed and would be free to leave Coventry City once his current deal expired. In November 2012, he re-joined Coalville Town on a free transfer from Lougborough Dynamo.

Quirke joined Coventry United on 31 July 2019, and was installed as the club's captain for the forthcoming campaign.

International career
He was called up to the  Republic of Ireland U21 international squad and made his international debut as a substitute in March 2011 in the Estádio Municipal de Águeda in Portugal.

References

External links

1991 births
Living people
English people of Irish descent
Footballers from Coventry
English footballers
Republic of Ireland association footballers
Association football goalkeepers
Coventry City F.C. players
Nuneaton Borough F.C. players
Coalville Town F.C. players
Leamington F.C. players
Bedworth United F.C. players
Loughborough Dynamo F.C. players
Kettering Town F.C. players
Coventry Alvis F.C. players
Coventry Sphinx F.C. players
Coventry United F.C. players
English Football League players
Republic of Ireland under-21 international footballers
Northern Premier League players
Southern Football League players